Puka Parish was a rural municipality of the Estonian county of Valga.

Settlements
Small borough
Puka
Villages
Aakre - Kähri - Kibena - Kolli - Komsi - Kuigatsi - Meegaste - Palamuste - Pedaste - Plika - Põru - Prange - Pühaste - Purtsi - Rebaste - Ruuna - Soontaga - Vaardi

Gallery

References